A Bhadgaunle Topi or Kalo Topi is a type of hat worn by Nepalis and  Indian Gorkhas. The hat has been adopted as a part of Nepali national dress for men, as an alternative to the Palpali Dhaka topi.

History
The hat is said to be in used since Malla era in Nepal, according to historians. However, the hat was only limited to Kathmandu Valley then. The hat became famous nationwide after King Tribhuvan and his son Mahendra started wearing it.

Historically, in the Panchayat era and earlier, the traditional black cap, produced by artisans in Bhaktapur, used to be the preferred accessory for men in Kathmandu. It was not just preferred for formal occasions or daily wear—all Nepali men had to don one if they wanted access to government offices and in halls of power, such as Singha Durbar.

Gallery

See also

 Dhaka topi
 Birke topi

References

Hats
Nepalese clothing